The Western Region Football League is an Australian rules football semi-professional league, based in the western suburbs of Melbourne, for both seniors and juniors.

History 
The league was formed in 1931 as the "Footscray District Football League".

During the 1950s, the VFL club Footscray was financially backing the competition, so they decided to bar clubs that were inside the  zone. This resulted in six clubs leaving. More changes occurred in 1952 as the league decided that clubs had to provide an under-18 competition; this action reduced the club numbers down to twelve. The next initiative was the introduction of an under-16 competition in 1954.

In 1988, the league absorbed clubs from the West Suburban Football League; and, in 2000, to reflect the fact that the league had expanded across the western suburbs, it changed its name to the Western Region Football League. The league's headquarters are at Whitten Oval, which is the home of current AFL club Western Bulldogs.

In 2002, the league, in particular its second Division, found itself a national audience when a Seven Network reality TV show, The Club, followed the performance of a team called the Kensington Hill Hammerheads throughout the season. The players, coach and president were chosen on the show, and after finishing third in the regular season, went on to win the flag.

In 2006, the league suspended the Central Altona Football Club for attempting to re-register a player, and they suspended Brunswick Power after the club was found guilty of playing unregistered players. In addition, Central Altona also had a variety of on-field violence and abuse issues, and they were also in trouble for re-registering banned players.

In 2013, Manor Lakes and Sanctuary Lakes entered the Division Two of the senior competition. In 2014, Werribee Districts transferred from the VAFA, and Tarneit entered a senior team. The league then announced that a third division will form midway through 2014.

In 2015, the Wyndham Suns were admitted to the third division. Parkside, which won the second division premiership in 2014, suffered a bitter internal division and lost most of the players and committee. Instead of being promoted to first division, Parkside staved off recess and were permitted to rebuild the club in the third division.

Clubs 
Participating clubs for the 2023 season:

Division One

Division Two

Division Three

Former Clubs

In Recess

Folded

Merged

Moved to CYMS Football Association

Moved to Essendon District Football League

Moved to Southern Football League

Moved to Victorian Football Association

Moved to Western Suburban Football League

Moved to Werribee District Football League

Premiers

Division One

Premiers by club (Div One) 

Notes

Division Two 

1934 – Newells 13.13.91 d Victor Socials 9.12.66
1935 – Baptist-Church 10.14.74 d Spotswood 5.8.38
1936 – Braybrook 7.20.62 d North Footscray 7.7.49
1937 – South Footscray 7.17.59 d Braybrook 6.20.56
1938 – North Footscray 10.17.77 d Combine 8.7.55
1939 – Victor Socials 10.5.65 d Combine 6.17.53
1940 – South Footscray 12.16.88 d Combine 10.12.72
1941 – West Footscray 20.13.133 d Victor Socials 11.13.79
1942 – Kingsville 17.12.114 d Sunshine Districts 11.13.79
1943 – Newport CYMS 9.16.70 d Spotswood 7.9.51
1944 – Spotswood 10.9.69 d Sunshine Districts 7.7.49
1945 – Essendon Districts 12.14.86 d Yarraville Socials 8.15.63
1946 – Sunshine Districts 11.17.83 d Spotswood 8.5.53
1947 – Altona 12.25.97 d Waratah 4.5.29
1948 – Spotswood 11.15.81 d St Albans 7.12.54
1949 Sec 1 – North Footscray 8.19.67 d F & Y Socials 9.10.64
1949 Sec 2 – 6th Melbourne Scouts 15.18.108 d West Footscray 5.4.34
1950 – Maidstone 10.10.70 d Williamstown Rovers 7.13.55
1951 – Altona 12.12.84 d Kingsville 11.7.73
NOTE: 1952 TO 1985 NO DIVISION 2 COMPETITION

1986 – North Sunshine 13.11.89 d EHSES 8.15.63
1987 – EHSES 22.10.142 d North Sunshine 4.10.34
1988 – Coburg Districts 7.10.52 d Ascot Vale 5.10.40
1989 – Ascot Vale 18.12.120 d Williamstown United 9.8.62
1990 – Port Melbourne Colts 16.18.114 d Hoppers Crossing 12.10.82
1991 – Altona City 10.14.74 d Sunshine Heights 7.13.55
1992 – Hoppers Crossing 5.12.42 d East Brunswick 4.5.29
1993 – Braybrook 9.15.69 d Sunshine Heights 7.4.46
1994 – Albion 18.12.120 d Sunshine YCW 11.17.83
1995 – West Newport 14.20.104 d Sunshine YCW 14.8.92
1996 – North Melb & Kens 17.18.120 d Fawkner Amateurs 9.8.62
1997 – St Albans 15.15.105 d North Footscray 9.9.63
1998 – Seddon/Yarraville Club 10.10.70 d Braybrook 8.6.54
1999 – Braybrook 12.21.93 d Central Altona 8.1.49
2000 – Yarraville 12.18.90 d Glen Orden 6.8.44
2001 – Seddon/Yarraville Club 18.12.120 d Albanvale 5.9.39
2002 – Kensington Hill Hammerheads 11.12.78 d North Footscray 7.11.53
2003 – North Sunshine 12.9.81 d Glen Orden 6.12.48
2004 – Altona 11.14.80 d Deer Park 8.7.55
2005 – Altona 19.12.126 d Glen Orden 8.9.57 
2006 – Glen Orden 13.20.98 d Deer Park 8.8.56 
2007 – West Footscray 18.16.124 d Sunshine Heights 7.16.58 
2008 – Sunshine Heights 18.7.115 d North Footscray 7.11.53
2009 – Deer Park 16.12.108 d Parkside 13.9.87
2010 – North Footscray 11.13.79 d Parkside 10.14.74 
2011 – Deer Park 21.23.149 d Albanvale 2.6.18 
2012 – Yarraville Seddon Eagles 14.14.98 d Parkside 9.16.70
2013 – Glen Orden 15.12.102 d Parkside 8.11.59
2014 – Parkside 14.20.104 d West Footscray 10.6.66
2015 – Wyndhamvale 17.12.114 d West Footscray 10.5.65
2016 – Caroline Springs 12.8.80 d Yarraville Seddon Eagles 9.12.66
2017 – North Footscray 15.14.104 d Yarraville Seddon Eagles 6.10.46
2018 – Point Cook 9.14.68 d Yarraville Seddon Eagles 8.13.61
2019 – Yarraville Seddon Eagles 14.17.101 d Wyndhamvale 4.10.34
2020 – No football played due to the COVID-19 pandemic 
2021 – Season not completed due to the COVID-19 pandemic 
2022 – Point Cook Centrals 10.4 (64) d Parkside 7.6 (48)

Division Three 

1988 – Sunshine Heights 11.21.87 d East Brunswick 7.11.53
1989 – Laverton 2.16.28 d Wyndhamvale 4.3.27
1990 – Braybrook 16.16.112 d East Brunswick 11.9.75
1991 – Wembley Park 11.15.81 d Glen Orden 12.7.79
1992 – Glenorden 8.11.59 d Newport 5.5.35 
1993 – North Melb & Kens 16.15.111 d Newport 4.6.30
1994 – Flemington 14.4.88 d Wyndhamvale 6.4.40
1995 – Newport 18.11.119 d Albanvale 3.15.33
1996 – West Newport 17.22.124 d Albanvale 7.10.52
1997 – Braybrook 18.18.126 d Laverton 10.16.76
1998 – Sunshine Heights 9.11.65 d Gladstone Park 8.11.59
2014 – Braybrook 12.15.87 d Albanvale 12.13.85
2015 – Albanvale 12.12.84 d Parkside 7.7.49
2016 – Newport Power 12.8.80 d Parkside 6.11.47
2017 – Parkside 12.17.89 d Tarneit 7.6.48
2018 – Point Cook Centrals 9.11.65 d Wyndham Suns 5.10.40
2019 – Glen Orden 10.12.72 d Albanvale 6.10.46
2020 – No football played due to the COVID-19 virus pandemic 
2021 – Season not completed due to the COVID-19 pandemic 
2022 – Braybrook 6.14 (50) d Wyndham Suns 5.18 (48)

Leading Goalkickers  (Andrew Gibson Medal)

Women's competition 
In 2018 the WRFL held a stand-alone women's competition for the first time as the number of women's clubs in the region grew large enough to allow this. In 2021 the competition expanded to two divisions. As of 2022 there were 14 women's teams across the two divisions.

Division 1

Division 2

Joining in 2023

Premiers

Division 1 
2018: Manor Lakes

2019: Spotswood

2022: Caroline Springs

Division 2 
2022: Point Cook Centrals

Junior clubs 

Aintree
Albanvale
Albion
Altona Juniors
Caroline Springs
Deer Park
Flemington Juniors
Glen Orden
Hoppers Crossing

Manor Lakes
Newport Power
North Footscray
PEGS Juniors
Point Cook
Point Cook Centrals
Spotswood
St Albans
St Bernard's
Sunshine

Sunshine Heights
Tarneit
Truganina Thunder
Werribee Centrals
Werribee Districts
West Footscray
Williamstown Juniors
Wyndham Suns
Wyndhamvale
Yarraville Seddon Eagles

Juniors-Only Clubs

Sources 
 The Mail (Newspaper published in Footscray)
 Annual Reports of the Western Region Football League
http://nla.gov.au/nla.news-article74738180
http://footyscorearchive.wiki-site.com/index.php/WESTERN_REGION_FOOTBALL_LEAGUE

Book 
History of the WRFL/FDFL – Kevin Hillier - 
History of Football in Melbourne's North West – John Stoward -

References

External links 
Official website

 
Australian rules football competitions in Victoria (Australia)